Renal–hepatic–pancreatic dysplasia is an autosomal recessive congenital disorder characterized by pancreatic fibrosis, renal dysplasia and hepatic dysgenesis. It is usually fatal soon after birth.An association with NPHP3 has been described.
It was characterized in 1959.

References

External links 
  GeneReview/NCBI/NIH/UW entry on Refsum Disease

Congenital disorders
Autosomal recessive disorders
Rare diseases